Moulton Township may refer to the following townships in the United States:

 Moulton Township, Murray County, Minnesota
 Moulton Township, Auglaize County, Ohio
 Moulton Township, Ontario